Halimedusa is a monotypic genus of hydrozoans belonging to the family Halimedusidae. The only species is Halimedusa typus.

The species is found in Northern America.

References

Halimedusidae
Hydrozoan genera
Monotypic cnidarian genera